"Listen to Your Heart" is a song recorded by British singer Lisa Stansfield. It was written by David Pickerill and Paul O'Donoughue, and produced by Pickerill. "Listen to Your Heart" was released as a single by the Devil Records/Polydor Records in the United Kingdom in 1983. The single's B-side included "The Thought Police" which also appeared on Stansfield's first single, "Your Alibis." "Listen to Your Heart" was released on the In Session album in 1996.

Track listings
UK 7" single
"Listen to Your Heart" – 3:19
"The Thought Police" – 3:15

References

Lisa Stansfield songs
1983 singles
1983 songs
Polydor Records singles